Meadowlands is a census-designated place in Washington County, Pennsylvania, United States. As of the 2020 census the population was 839.

Demographics

References

Census-designated places in Washington County, Pennsylvania
Census-designated places in Pennsylvania